Delmarva Christian High School is a private Christian high school located in Georgetown, Delaware, the geographic center, and county seat of Sussex County.

Background
In April 1999 a group of Sussex County educators, businesspeople, pastors, and parents came together to form Delmarva Christian Schools, Inc., to address the issue of high school education for Christian high school students. Delmarva is not a charter school, but a privately funded education facility dedicated to providing quality academic education, while providing youth the knowledge of how to apply biblical principles to their daily lives.

External links
 

Christian schools in Delaware
High schools in Sussex County, Delaware
Private high schools in Delaware